Chaetophora spinosa is a species of pill beetle in the family Byrrhidae. It is found in Europe and Northern Asia (excluding China) and North America.

References

Further reading

External links

 

Byrrhidae
Articles created by Qbugbot
Beetles described in 1794